''Note: Weapons listed were made by or for Germany and do not include captured foreign equipment.

Pistols

Rifles
.

Machine guns

Submachine guns

Anti-tank weapons

Other weapons

See also
 List of equipment used in World War II
 List of German military equipment of World War II
 List of World War II Luftwaffe aircraft weapons
 List of aircraft of the World War II Luftwaffe
 List of common World War II infantry weapons
 List of secondary and special issue World War II infantry weapons
 German General Staff - a post-1933 section to understand the variety of the above list.
 List of rifle cartridges
 List of handgun cartridges
 List of firearms
 Glossary of World War II German military terms
 Captured US firearms in Axis use in World War II
 German designations of foreign firearms in World War II

References
Citations

Bibliography

External links
 German Weapons During WW2 (Rifles, Guns, Mines, Vehicles)
Axis Small Arms

world war ii Germany

Firearms
Germany firearms